SMHS is a four-letter abbreviation that may refer to:

San Marino High School
South Miami High School
San Marcos High School (disambiguation), multiple schools
San Mateo High School
Santa Margarita Catholic High School (also abbreviated SMCHS)
Santa Maria High School
Santa Monica High School
any of several Schools of Medicine and Health Sciences
Scecina Memorial High School
Shadow Mountain High School
Signal Mountain High School
Smoky Mountain High School
Smoky Mountain Historical Society
South Medford High School
South Mecklenburg High School
South Milwaukee High School
South Mountain High School
Spruce Mountain High School
St. Mark Catholic High School (Ottawa)
St. Mary's High School (disambiguation)
Stone Mountain High School
Sunrise Mountain High School
Spring Mills High School
SMHS Hospital at Srinagar